Hurricane is a retired Special Operations canine of the United States Secret Service. He is a 12-year-old black  Belgian Malinois recognized for his valor and bravery in 2014.

Hurricane served with his handler, Officer Marshall Mirarchi, for four years on the Secret Service's elite Emergency Response Team, a unit within the Special Operations Division. As part of the ERT's tactical canine unit, Hurricane protected the President of the United States, the vice president, their families, and visiting dignitaries. 

On October 22, 2014, Hurricane protected President Obama and the First Family from an intruder who had scaled the perimeter fence of the White House and was heading towards the residence. When the first attempt at intercepting the intruder was unsuccessful, Hurricane was given the go ahead by Officer Mirarchi. Despite being repeatedly punched, kicked and swung around by the intruder, Hurricane kept a hold until armed officers were able to apprehend the intruder. 

Hurricane retired from the U.S. Secret Service on September 20, 2016 and was adopted by his handler, Marshall Mirarchi.

Awards 
K9 Hurricane has been recognized for his bravery and heroic actions over the years: 

 2014: The US Secret Service presented Hurricane and Mirarchi with the Award for Meritorious Service. 
 2015: Hurricane and Mirarchi were awarded the Secretary's Award for Valor by the US Department of Homeland Security, the first award ever presented to U.S. Secret Service canine. 
 2016: Hurricane was the recipient of the Animal Medical Center in New York City’s Top Dog Award. 
 2019: Hurricane was presented with Great Britain's PDSA Order of Merit for Outstanding Devotion and Service to Society, the first international recipient of the award.
 2022: In a ceremony at the U.S. Capitol on March 9, 2022, Hurricane became the first recipient of the Animals in War & Peace Distinguished Service Medal.

References

Dogs
Individual dogs
Military animals